Parysów  is a village in Garwolin County, Masovian Voivodeship, in east-central Poland. It is the seat of the gmina (administrative district) called Gmina Parysów.

The village has a population of 1,100.

References

External links
 Jewish Community in Parysów on Virtual Shtetl

Villages in Garwolin County
Lublin Governorate
Warsaw Voivodeship (1919–1939)